The Pletzl (פלעצל, "little place" in Yiddish) is the Jewish quarter in the 4th arrondissement of Paris, France. The Place Saint-Paul and the surrounding area were unofficially named the Pletzl  when the neighborhood became predominantly Jewish after an influx of immigrants in the late 19th and early 20th centuries.

The area hosts a diverse Jewish community, assembling traditional Jewish families as well as many more who arrived through immigration from Eastern Europe and North Africa through the past centuries. The area is now characterised by its synagogues, butchers, delicatessens, and falafel vendors, which provide a social and cultural fabric for its inhabitants.

The darkest days for the Pletzl came during World War II, when Vichy France's collaboration with the Nazis resulted in raids that saw many residents abducted and sent off to concentration camps. Today, the community is a religious Orthodox one, and most citizens belong to one of the three local synagogues: one located at 17 Rue des Rosiers, another at 25 Rue des Rosiers, and the last one at 10 Rue Pavée; the latter is an art nouveau temple designed by Hector Guimard, famous for his work on the Paris Métro.

Name
At an unknown date, Paris installed a plaque at the corner of the Rue des Rosiers and the Rue Ferdinand Duval that explains why the Jewish quarter is known as the "Pletzl". Translated, it reads:

Metro station
The Pletzl is:

The streets of the Pletzl 
 Rue Pavée
 Rue des Rosiers
 Rue Ferdinand Duval
 Rue des Écouffes
 Rue des Hospitalières-Saint-Gervais
 Rue Vieille du Temple

Notable attractions
 L'As du Fallafel - a popular Kosher Middle Eastern restaurant located on rue de Rosiers known for its acclaimed falafel sandwich.
 Synagogue at 17 rue de Rosiers, fondly known as "Zibetzin" (lit. 17) which was frequented by many of the Chabad-Lubavitch rebbes during their time in Paris.

Bibliography
Etude remarquable de Nancy Green : The Pletzl of Paris : Jewish immigrant workers in the Belle époque, New York ; London : Holmes and Meier, 1986, IX-270 p. ; éd. fr., Les Travailleurs immigrés juifs à la Belle époque : le " Pletzl " de Paris, Paris, Fayard, 1985, 360 p.

References

External links 

 
4th arrondissement of Paris
Ashkenazi Jewish culture in Paris
Jewish communities
Jews and Judaism in Paris
Yiddish culture in France